Homo Sapiens (1994) is an album by the Finnish rock group YUP.

Track listing
All songs written by Tynkkynen unless noted otherwise. Lyrics by Martikainen unless noted otherwise.

 "Beelsebub ei nuku koskaan" (Martikainen) - 5.25 "Beelzebub Never Sleeps"
 "Balthasar oli naisten mies" - 4.55 "Balthasar Was A Ladies Man" 
 "Homo sapiens" (Tynkkynen, Martikainen) - 5.22
 "Oikeusjuttu" - 3.33 "The Trial" 
 "Tänään kotona" - 4.02 "Home Today"
 "Jumala halkaisi ihmisen kahtia" - 5.07 "God Split The Human In Two "
 "Väärinkäsityksiä merellä" (Tiainen, Martikainen) - 5.06 "Misconceptions On The Sea"
 "Domus perkele" (Martikainen) - 3.43 
 "Tyly puhe" (Tynkkynen, Hyyrynen, lyrics by Martikainen, A. Leikas) - 5.27 "An Unkind Speech"
 "Alkemisti" - 3.00 "Alchemist"

Personnel
Musicians
 Jarkko Martikainen  – guitar, vocals
 Valtteri Tynkkynen – bass
 Jussi Hyyrynen – guitar
 Janne Mannonen – drums
 Petri Tiainen – keyboards
 Tero Kling - flute

Production
 Ville Pirinen - sleeve design
 Risto Närhi - engineer
 Juha Heininen - mixing
 Mats Hulden - producer, mixing
 Pedro Hietanen - executive producer

References

YUP (band) albums
1994 albums